The 1959 Delaware State Hornets football team represented Delaware State College—now known as Delaware State University—as a member of the Central Intercollegiate Athletic Association (CIAA) in the 1959 NCAA College Division football season. Led by coach Preston Mitchell in his only season, the Hornets compiled a 1–7 record, being outscored 72 to 155.

Schedule

References

Delaware State
Delaware State Hornets football seasons
Delaware State Hornets football